Prednazate, a combination of prednisolone hemisuccinate with perphenazine, is a synthetic glucocorticoid corticosteroid as well as typical antipsychotic and sedative/tranquilizer. It was a component of Sixty Six-20, a combination of prednazate (prednisolone hemisuccinate and perphenazine) and chlorpheniramine.

See also
 Prednazoline
 Prednimustine

References

Anxiolytics
Chloroarenes
Corticosteroid esters
Corticosteroids
Diketones
Glucocorticoids
Mineralocorticoids
Phenothiazines
Piperazines
Pregnanes
Sedatives
Succinate esters
Triols
Typical antipsychotics